Eslamabad-e Deh Now (also Romanized as Eslāmābād-e Deh Now; also known as Eslāmābād) is a village in Sarfaryab Rural District, Sarfaryab District, Charam County, Kohgiluyeh and Boyer-Ahmad Province, Iran. At the 2006 census, its population was 489, in 100 families.

References 

Populated places in Charam County